Drivdalen is a river valley located in the municipality of Oppdal in Trøndelag county, Norway.  The valley surrounds the river Driva.  The European route E6 and the Dovre Line follow the river through much of the valley.   The valley is the site of the "Old Kings' Road", Vårstigen, with Kongsvoll being one stop along the road.

The valley runs north through Oppdal, and then at the mountain Allmannberget and the village of Oppdal, the valley (and river) turns west and heads into the neighboring municipality of Sunndal, where it is known as the Sunndalen valley.  The Dovrefjell–Sunndalsfjella National Park lies southwest and east of the valley.

Drivdalen is known for its lush vegetation and is of special botanical importance with a number of rare species and varieties. In the southernmost part, where the valley starts at Dovrefjell is found the Kongsvoll Alpine Garden of the NTNU University Museum.

See also
List of rivers in Norway

References

Oppdal
Valleys of Trøndelag